Victor Charles Buono (February 3, 1938January 1, 1982) was an American actor, comic, and briefly a recording artist. He was known for playing the villain King Tut in the television series Batman (1966–1968) and musician Edwin Flagg in What Ever Happened to Baby Jane? (1962), the latter of which earned him Academy Award and Golden Globe Award nominations. He was a busy actor from his late teens until his death at the age of 43 and, with his large size and sonorous voice, he made a career of playing men much older than he was.

Early life and career
Buono was the son of Victor F. Buono. His father was a former police officer and bail bondsman who was sentenced to life imprisonment after being found guilty of first-degree murder and conspiracy to commit robbery in 1959. Released on parole after seven years but forced to serve a further sentence due to a previous conviction for bird smuggling, Victor Sr. continued to manage the affairs of his son whilst in prison. Buono's maternal grandmother, Myrtle Glied, was a vaudeville performer on the Orpheum Circuit. When he was a boy, she taught him songs and recitations and encouraged him to perform for visitors. 

He started appearing on local radio and television stations, and at age 18 joined the Globe Theater Players in San Diego. The director had confidence in Buono and cast him in Volpone, A Midsummer Night's Dream and other Globe presentations. He received good notices for his various Shakespearean roles and in modern plays such as The Man Who Came to Dinner and Witness for the Prosecution.

In the summer of 1959, a talent scout from Warner Bros. saw the heavy-set Buono play Falstaff at the Globe and took him to Hollywood for a screen test. Buono made his first network TV appearance playing the bearded poet Bongo Benny in an episode of 77 Sunset Strip. Over the next few years, he played menacing heavies in series on TV and appeared on The Untouchables. After appearing in a few uncredited film roles, he was cast by director Robert Aldrich in the psychological horror movie What Ever Happened to Baby Jane? (1962). The film starred Bette Davis and Joan Crawford and Buono played the hapless musical accompanist Edwin Flagg, a performance for which he was nominated for the Academy Award for Best Supporting Actor and the Golden Globe Award for Best Supporting Actor – Motion Picture.

Noteworthy film roles
Shortly after What Ever Happened to Baby Jane?, Buono appeared in Hush...Hush, Sweet Charlotte (1964) as Big Sam Hollis, the father of Bette Davis, who played the title role. The film was also directed by Aldrich. In the Biblical epic The Greatest Story Ever Told (1965), Buono portrayed the High Priest Sorak, and in The Strangler, a film based on the actual Boston Strangler Murders of the time, he portrayed Leo Kroll.

He also appeared in 4 for Texas (1963), Robin and the 7 Hoods (1964), The Silencers (1966), Who's Minding the Mint? (1967), Target: Harry (1969), Beneath the Planet of the Apes (1970), The Mad Butcher (1972) and The Evil (1978).

Television roles

Though Buono had a vast body of work in movies, he also had extensive television appearances to his credit; one was in the recurring role of Count Manzeppi in The Wild Wild West. He also played unrelated characters in that series' premiere episode and in the second and final Wild Wild West reunion movie More Wild Wild West (1980).

Buono was cast to play villains of various ethnic origins on many television programs between 1960 and 1970. He was cast twice in 1960 in the western series The Rebel, starring Nick Adams, in the episodes "Blind Marriage" and "The Earl of Durango". In 1962, he played Melanthos Moon in an episode of The Untouchables, titled "Mr. Moon", where he played a San Francisco art and antique dealer who hijacked a supply of the paper used for printing United States currency. In a 1963 episode of the same series, titled The Gang War, he played Pamise Surigao, a liquor smuggler competing with the Chicago mob.

In the episode "Firebug" (January 27, 1963) of the anthology series GE True, hosted by Jack Webb, Buono plays a barber in Los Angeles, who is by night a pyromaniac. In the storyline, the United States Forest Service believes one arsonist is causing a series of fires in California.

Buono appeared in four episodes of Perry Mason. In season 5, (March 17, 1962), he portrayed Alexander Glovatsky, a small-town sculptor, in "The Case of the Absent Artist". In season 7, (April 2, 1964), he played murderer John (Jack) Sylvester Fossette in the episode "The Case of the Simple Simon". In season 8, (April 29, 1965) he played murderer Nathon Fallon in "The Case of the Grinning Gorilla". In season 9, (February 27, 1966), he appeared in "The Case of the Twice Told Twist", the only color episode, as Ben Huggins, the ringleader of a car-stripping ring.

Buono played the villain King Tut on the television series Batman. A Jekyll-and-Hyde character, William McElroy is a timid Yale professor of Egyptology who, after being hit in the head with a brick at a peace rally, assumes the persona of the charismatic, monomaniacal Egyptian King Tut. When he suffers another blow to the head, the villain recovers his meek academic personality. The role, which proved to be the most frequently featured original villain in the series, was one of Buono's favorites because he was delighted at being able to overact without restraint.

He played another campy villain, “Mr. Memory”, in a 1967 unsold TV pilot film based on the Dick Tracy comic strip, from the same producers of Batman and The Green Hornet.

Buono also played a scientist bent on world domination in the Voyage to the Bottom of the Sea in an episode titled "The Cyborg".

Buono made a guest appearance as Hannibal Day in the Get Smart episode "Moonlighting Becomes You", originally airing January 2, 1970, and appeared three times as Dr. Blaine in the  sitcom Harrigan and Son, starring Pat O'Brien and Roger Perry as a father-and-son team of lawyers. He appeared in a segment of Night Gallery titled "Satisfaction Guaranteed". He also appeared in an episode of Hawaii Five-O, "The $100,000 Nickel", in which he played thief Eric Damien. It first aired on December 11, 1973. He made two memorable appearances on The Odd Couple, once in the episode "The Exorcists" and again in "The Rent Strike", where he portrayed Mr. Lovelace. In 1976, he appeared in comedy The Practice, portraying Bernard on the episode "Jules and the Bum". He also made nine appearances on the 1977 series Man from Atlantis, appearing all nine times as Mr. Schubert, the enemy of the main character.

Comedy record albums and comic poetry
In the 1970s, Buono released several comedy record albums which poked fun at his large stature, the first of which was Heavy!, as well as a book of comic poetry called It Could Be Verse. He began to style himself as "the fat man from Batman". During guest appearances on The Tonight Show Starring Johnny Carson, he frequently recited his poetry. The most popular of his poems was "Fat Man's Prayer", a work often erroneously attributed to Dom DeLuise or Jackie Gleason. It included many widely quoted couplets such as:

Later career
In the late 1970s and in 1980, Buono played the millionaire father of the memory-impaired Reverend Jim Ignatowski on Taxi. Buono died before the end of the series. One episode was made where Jim learns to cope with his father's death.

In 1980, Buono appeared in the television movie Murder Can Hurt You as Chief Ironbottom, a parody of the title character from Ironside. His later roles were more of pompous intellectuals and shady con men, although he also played straight roles. In the miniseries Backstairs at the White House (1979), he portrayed President William Howard Taft. Buono also appeared on 4 different episodes of the ABC series Vega$ with Robert Urich, playing a sage and yet also street wise Las Vegas casino high roller, named 'Diamond Jim'.

Death
Buono was found dead at his home in Apple Valley, California on New Year's Day 1982; he died of a heart attack.
He is entombed with his mother, Myrtle, in Greenwood Memorial Park in San Diego, but his name is not inscribed on the crypt.

Personal life
Buono liked to read and write, and one of his main interests was Shakespeare. "The more you study him," he said, "the greater he grows." He was also highly regarded as a gourmet chef.
He attended the University of San Diego.

In regard to relationships (and the implicit questioning of his sexuality), Buono is quoted as saying, "I've heard or read about actors being asked the immortal question, 'Why have you never married?' They answer with the immortal excuse, 'I just haven't found the right girl.' Because I'm on the hefty side, no one's asked me yet. If they do, that's the answer I'll give. After all, if it was good enough for Monty Clift or Sal Mineo..." Buono was closeted, like most gay actors at the time, but lived with boyfriends, and referred to himself as a "conscientious objector" in the "morality revolution" of the 1960s.

Filmography

Award nominations

References

External links
 
 
 
 

1938 births
1982 deaths
20th-century American male actors
American male film actors
American male radio actors
American male stage actors
American male television actors
LGBT people from California
American gay actors
Male actors from San Diego
Burials at Greenwood Memorial Park (San Diego)
People from Apple Valley, California
20th-century American LGBT people